Sadiq Abubakar III International Airport or Sultan Saddik Abubakar Airport  is an airport serving Sokoto, the capital of the Sokoto State in Nigeria. It is named after Siddiq Abubakar III, the Sultan of Sokoto from 1938 to 1988.

Airlines and destinations

Statistics

See also
Transport in Nigeria
List of airports in Nigeria
Federal Airports Authority of Nigeria

References

External links

OurAirports - Sokoto
SkyVector - Sokoto

Airports in Nigeria
Sokoto
Sokoto State